From Beyond the Back Burner is the debut album by Arizona-based pop rock band Gas Giants, released on Atomic Pop Records on October 19, 1999.

Reception
AllMusic gave the recording three out of five stars and in its review by Stephen Thomas Erlewine praises the band for feeling like it is having fun and including humor in the lyrics. He writes that the album is "unassuming, good-natured, and melodic hard-pop". In CMJ New Music Monthly, Meredith Ochs gave the album a mixed review, saying that it followed from Gin Blossoms' work and expanded it by adding stadium rock guitar but "although Wilson's melodies pull the songs together, the hooks don't really stick without great lyrics to hang on".

Track listing
All songs written by Gas Giants
"Now the Change" – 4:48
"I Hope My Kids Like Marilyn Manson" – 2:25
"In Between Two Worlds" – 3:35
"Stinking Up the Charts" – 3:17
"Whose Side Are You On" – 4:40
"Circus of Stars" – 3:32
"Quitter" – 3:52
"Useless" – 3:14
"Letter" – 3:19
"Going Down" – 3:16
"Like It or Not" – 3:08
"Tonight Won't Let Me Wonder" – 4:22
"You're Absolutely" – 4:22

Personnel
Gas Giants
Mickey Ferrell – bass guitar
Daniel Henzerling – lead guitar, vocals
Phillip Rhodes – drums, vocals
Robin Wilson – lead vocals, guitar

Additional personnel
John Hampton – production

References

External links

1999 debut albums
Gas Giants (band) albums
Albums produced by John Hampton (music producer)